The Phrenologist Coon is a 1901 song written by Ernest Hogan with music by Will Accooe. Bert Williams recorded it on Victor Records and sheet music was published for it. It was produced by Williams and Walker Co. and published by Jos. W. Stern & Co. in New York City.

The lyrics describe a conjureman engaging in phrenology.

The tune as a schottische was used for the 1902 song Maiden with the Dreamy Eyes.

References

External links 

 Recording via Discography of American Historical Recordings

1901 songs
Victor Records singles